The 2017 Gold Coast Football Club season was the Gold Coast Suns' seventh season in the Australian Football League. They also fielded a reserves team in the NEAFL.

AFL

List changes

Retirements and delistings

Trades

Free Agency

In

National draft

Rookie draft

Squad

Season summary

Pre-season

Home and Away season

Ladder

NEAFL

References

Gold Coast Suns seasons
2017 Australian Football League season